Robert Leonard Schenck (born 1958) is an American Evangelical clergyman who ministers to elected and appointed officials in Washington, D.C., and serves as president of a non-profit organization named for Dietrich Bonhoeffer. Since 1982, Schenck has preached in all 50 states, several Canadian provinces, and over 40 countries. He is the subject of the Emmy Award-winning 2016 Abigail Disney documentary, The Armor of Light. Once a prominent anti-abortion activist, Schenck has since repudiated this work and shifted leftward on some of his socially conservative views, testifying before a congressional committee regarding statements in his book about the Supreme Court. He distanced himself from past views and actions, stating in a blog post that he had "promulgated" lies in the past.

Early years

Robert Lenard Schenck and his identical twin brother, Paul, were born in 1958 in Montclair, New Jersey, to Chaim "Henry Paul" Schenck and Marjorie (née Apgar) Schenck. Schenck was named after his father's older brother who was a decorated B-17 bomber pilot in World War II and who lost his life in an air crash while serving in the Korean War. Schenck's father was born Jewish, raised in Manhattan and attended a Reform Temple on Long Island, and Schenck's mother was born Catholic in Brooklyn, raised non-religious (she converted to Judaism when marrying his father), and grew up in Northern New Jersey.

Schenck grew up in Grand Island, New York. He and his friends started GASP: Grand Island Association Against Pollution, which served as an early community recycling center.

Conversion to Christianity
As a self-described "rebellious teen" Schenck and brother Paul became involved in risky behavior. Then in 1974 at the age of 16, the boys became acquainted with the son of a United Methodist minister serving the Trinity United Methodist Church in Grand Island. After Paul was introduced to a circle of young, religious Christians, he decided to become a Christian. Schenck accompanied his brother to prayer meetings, and soon converted as well. Both brothers were baptized in the waters of the Niagara River, which forms the borders of Grand Island. The conversion displeased their father, who felt that Schenck was rejecting his Jewish roots, but their mother, who had converted from Catholicism when she married Henry, was more understanding. Henry later came to accept Schenck's conversion and traveled with him on a religious mission to Russia.

Family
While attending a youth prayer group in Grand Island, Schenck met Cheryl Smith, whom he married in 1977 after graduating from Grand Island High School. They have two children.

Religious affiliations

From 2012 to 2016, Schenck served as chairman of the board of directors of the Evangelical Church Alliance (ECA). He was also chairman of ECA's Committee for Church and Society, the social witness arm of the alliance of ministers. In 2018, he became an advisor to the Office of the Secretary General of the World Evangelical Alliance (WEA)

Early ministry

After serving in various capacities with the Rochester, New York Teen Challenge center, a church sponsored home for at-risk youth, Schenck was selected as the director of a Rochester, New York program and then executive director of the statewide network of homes known as Empire State Teen Challenge that included facilities in Syracuse and Buffalo, New York. In 1980, Schenck left Teen Challenge and served a short stint as Youth Pastor for the Webster Assembly of God congregation in a suburb of Rochester, followed by another short post as a staff pastor for the Community Gospel Church in Long Island City, Queens, New York (now Evangel Church and Christian School). In the latter role, he was mainly tasked with developing a training program for college interns in urban cross-cultural ministry. The program eventually became the New York School of Urban Ministry or NYSUM.

In 1982, Schenck reunited with his brother Paul in ministry and became minister of missions and evangelism at the New Covenant Tabernacle in Tonawanda, New York (suburban Buffalo) where Paul was the senior pastor. They worked together in ministry from 1982 to 1994. During that time Schenck formed New Covenant Evangelical Ministries that was later renamed P & R Schenck Associates in Evangelism.

Faithwalk
In 1988, Schenck, an Assembly of God minister took a long-distance walk to help people in Mexico who live and work in garbage dumps. While he visited Mexico City in 1982, he became aware of the plight of the "dump people". Schenck took a  walk from Buffalo, NY, through eight states and crossed the border at Laredo, Texas. He hoped to raise $1 million to build a clinic and recruit volunteers willing to help provide medical, dental, and construction services.

Buffalo anti-abortion activism 1992
In 1992, during Buffalo's large-scale abortion clinic demonstrations, Schenck grabbed national and worldwide attention when photos and video were shot of him cradling a preserved human fetus given the name "Tia" by a black anti-abortion group because the fetus was believed to be African-American. Much was written and aired about the event. In an opinion editorial in the June 15 Buffalo News, Schenck responded to the criticism. According to the op-ed, Schenck believed that pro-choice supporters ignored the truth in favor of ideology, and conversely he believed that the fetus demonstrated the truth of his own views. "Most have never seen an abortion, let alone the result of it. Baby Tia takes the argument out of the abstract and into reality."

Some time after 2010, Schenck changed his mind about abortion, stating that banning abortion would cause more harm than good, and opposed the effort to overturn Roe v. Wade. He concludes his May 31, 2019, Op-Ed for the New York Times "No doubt, many of my former allies will call me a turncoat. I don’t see it that way. I still believe that every abortion is a tragedy and that when a woman is pregnant, bringing the child into the world is always ideal. Reality, though, is different from fantasy. I wish every child could be fully nurtured and cared for, and could experience all the wonderful possibilities that life can offer." In the 2020 documentary, AKA Jane Roe, Schenck stated that the anti-abortion movement had exploited Norma McCorvey (aka Jane Roe) and that it was highly unethical to have paid her to support the anti-abortion movement.

Later ministry

D.C. activities
Schenck went to Washington, D.C. to increase the role of evangelical Christianity in government. He became on-call as a member of the U.S. Senate Chaplain's Pastoral Response Team. In 2010, Schenck was named the first Chaplain in the 40-year history of the Capitol Hill Executive Service Club, the only association of its kind allowed to meet weekly in the Mansfield Room of the United States Capitol.[citation needed] In these last two capacities, he also routinely carried out the normal roles of a member of the Christian clergy including sacerdotal and ministerial functions such as administering baptism and Holy Communion, solemnizing weddings, conducting funerals, providing pastoral care, counseling and visitation and presiding at various public and private religious ceremonies. [citation needed]

Pastoring and preaching
In August 1994, in order to minister to national decision makers, Schenck and family moved to Washington, D.C. His first ministry there was to organize a new church. He attracted a core group of worshippers and created what became the National Community Church. He served as pastor for over a year until deciding to focus on government officials. In the beginning of 1996, when Mark Batterson took over as pastor the church had around 30 people in attendance.

On Sunday, November 29, Schenck was a guest preacher at a Sunday worship service at the Washington National Cathedral. Schenck was invited to speak because of his opposition to gun violence and the documentary focusing on him, which was screened at the church following the service.

Ten Commandments Project
Created in 1995, his Ten Commandments Project has given over 400 plaques of the Ten Commandments to members of Congress and other highly placed officials, including former presidents Clinton and Bush. Special delegations made up of clergy and lay people make the presentations during ceremonies held in the recipients' offices. The agenda included a short speech which describes religion as the foundational basis of morality and law, a reading of the Commandments in their entirety, and prayers. The official was given an inscribed wooden plaque on which is mounted two stone polymer tablets containing a summary of the Ten Commandments. Recipients were urged to "display and obey" the Ten Commandments.

National Memorial for the Preborn
In 1995, Schenck organized the first National Memorial for the Preborn and their Mothers and Fathers, a religious service in opposition to abortion. This  event was held inside the US Capitol complex in Washington, D.C. The event was sponsored by the National Pro-Life Religious Council.

Congressional Testimony 
In December 2022, Schenck was called to testify before the House Judiciary Committee hearing regarding the Supreme Court. He came under "withering criticism" by some House members, who called him, "a pathetic grifter," and a "con man" with "zero credibility."

National activities

Judge Moore's Monument
In 2003, Schenck helped organize a supportive demonstration outside of the Alabama Judicial building, seat of the state's Supreme Court when Roy Moore was chief justice. By that time, Schenck had a long cooperative association with Moore who refused to relocate a granite monument to the historic basis of the law that included the Ten Commandments. The monument was eventually ordered moved by US District Judge Myron Thompson. When US marshals were dispatched to supervise the removal, Schenck and several others surrounded the monument, knelt and started to pray. He was arrested and held for 5½ hours while the monument was moved. Schenck was interviewed on numerous television shows regarding the events.

Stopping Burn-a-Koran Day
During September 2010, Schenck opposed the proposed burning of the Koran by pastor Terry Jones. In an interview with CBN on September 8, Schenck said this particular demonstration, while possibly warranted by common values and certainly permissible under the Constitution, violated Christian morality, adding that he believed Christians were held to a higher standard. "[I]t's impossible for me to cite one instance in the life or teaching of Jesus Christ that could justify such an act", Schenck said. He also stated objections to fallout in religious relations; "He's not just burning Korans, he's also burning bridges that we were trying to build for years with the Islamic community".

Schenck represented the National Clergy Council in speaking personally with Jones, and asked Jones if, in a show of good faith, he would surrender custody of the Korans at the center of the controversy to Schenck's colleague, the Reverend Patrick Mahoney of the Christian Defense Coalition. Jones agreed to do so. As a condition of his cancellation, Jones wanted the relocation of Park51. Schenck attempted to broker a meeting between Jones and Imam Faisal Rauf. However, a meeting never occurred and Jones did not burn Korans on September 11.

Houston sermons subpoena
On May 28, 2014, Houston, Texas, Mayor Annise Parker approved the controversial Houston Equal Rights Ordinance (HERO), which included a broad range of extenuating rights for the LGBT community without an exemption for religious organizations. Opponents of the ordinance collected signatures to put the Bill to a public vote. On July 3, 2014, over 50,000 signatures were delivered to the city, which invalidated around 35,000 of the signatures and canceled the vote. On August 7, 2014, Houston citizens' groups filed suit to block implementation of HERO, which was put on hold.

In mid-2014, Mayor Parker's legal team subpoenaed sermons and sermon notes of local clergy members who had opposed the HERO ordinance. The subpoena required the clergy that "all speeches, presentations, or sermons related to HERO, the Petition, Mayor Parker, homosexuality, or gender identity prepared by, delivered by, revised by, or approved by you or in your possession" be turned over to the mayor's lawyers for review. This caused a backlash around the country from religious freedom advocates as well as concerned citizens. As President of the National Clergy Council, Rob Schenck and other pastors met with Mayor Parker to request that her legal order be withdrawn. A group of local pastors also met with the mayor. Shortly thereafter, the mayor instructed her attorneys to withdraw the subpoenas. Afterwards Rev. Schenck said, "Our meeting with the mayor was cordial and very productive ... we never relaxed or compromised our demand for her to unequivocally withdraw the subpoenas. We're thankful to her and we are supremely thankful to God for this positive outcome."

In July 2015, the Texas Supreme Court ordered that HERO be either repealed or placed on the ballot. The City Council placed the measure for open vote and it was defeated by a large margin.

National Center for State Courts
In October 2015, Schenck was appointed to serve on the National Advisory Board on Community Engagement in the State Courts. This board, sponsored by the National Center for State Courts and Chaired by the Chief Justice of the D.C. Court of appeals, seeks to create dialogue between minority and economically disadvantaged communities and court leadership so that there is an increase in public trust and confidence in the court system.

The Armor of Light documentary
In 2015, Schenck was the subject of the critically acclaimed documentary, The Armor of Light. In this film, directed by Abigail Disney Schenck discusses the topic of guns and the anti-abortion Christian community's response to America's gun culture and gun violence. The movie was called a "vital colloquy on whether we shape our lives through fear or with love" by the Los Angeles Times. Schenck was invited to the Cathedral following the Washington, D.C. screening of the full-length documentary..[citation needed]

The Dietrich Bonhoeffer Institute 
He serves as president of a non-profit organization known as The Dietrich Bonhoeffer Institute. In 2019, the organization paid Schenck $147,000 from a budget of $422,612.

Roe v. Wade complainant Norma McCorvey payments
Schenck later stated that he was once part of a group that paid Norma McCorvey (1947–2017) — also known as Jane Roe in the landmark Roe v. Wade Supreme Court decision — to lie that she had changed her mind and joined anti-abortion movements. Having denounced the pro-life movement in 2019, he publicly stated, in 2020, that McCorvey was paid to pose as an anti-abortion rights activist and that "What we did with Norma was highly unethical".

Faith and Action Supreme Court influence campaign
On December 8, 2022, the House Committee on the Judiciary convened a hearing, "Undue Influence: Operation Higher Court and Politicking at SCOTUS", to determine covert activity and influence on members of the U.S. Supreme Court by Faith and Action (now Faith and Liberty) under Schenck's leadership.

References

External links
 
 The Dietrich Bonhoeffer Institute
 Operation Serve International
 Hearts for the Homeless
 The Armor of Light Film
 

1958 births
Living people
Activists from New York (state)
American anti-abortion activists
People from Grand Island, New York
People from Montclair, New Jersey
American evangelicals
Converts to Christianity from Judaism
American people of Jewish descent
Activists from New Jersey
Religious leaders from New York (state)
Religious leaders from New Jersey